Mahmudli is a Syrian town located in Raqqa Governorate approximately 20 km north of Al-Thawrah on the road from Tishrin to Raqqa.

During the Syrian Civil War, the town was occupied by the self-proclaimed Islamic State from May 2014 onward for almost three years. On 1 January 2017, the Syrian Democratic Forces liberated Mahmudli after two days of intense clashes.

References

Populated places in al-Thawrah District